Svante John Granlund (1 February 1921 – 28 November 2010) was a Swedish ice hockey player. He competed in the men's tournament at the 1948 Winter Olympics.

References

External links
 

1921 births
2010 deaths
Ice hockey players at the 1948 Winter Olympics
Olympic ice hockey players of Sweden
Ice hockey people from Stockholm